Podveža is a dispersed settlement of isolated farmsteads and highland pastures in the Municipality of Luče in Slovenia. The area belongs to the traditional region of Styria and is now included in the Savinja Statistical Region. It encompasses the Dleskovec Plateau.

References

External links

Podveža on Geopedia

Populated places in the Municipality of Luče